Acronicta iria is a moth of the family Noctuidae first described by Charles Swinhoe in 1899. It is found in India.

References

Acronicta
Moths of Asia
Moths described in 1899